Pride of Gall Hill FC is a Barbados football club, based in Gall Hill near Oistins in the southern parish of Christ Church.

Sponsored by Stephen Lashley, they play in the Barbados' first division, the Barbados Premier Division.

Achievements
Barbados Premier Division: 2
 1988, 1993

Barbados FA Cup: 4
 1993, 1995, 1998, 2006

References

Football clubs in Barbados